The 1944 All-Eastern football team consists of American football players chosen by various selectors as the best players at each position among the Eastern colleges and universities during the 1944 college football season.

All-Eastern selections

Backs
 Harold Hamburg, Navy (AP-1 [qb])
 Glenn Davis, Army (AP-1 [hb])
 Rob Jenkins, Navy (AP-1 [hb])
 Doc Blanchard, Army (AP-1 [fb])

Ends
 Leon Bramlett, Jr., end (AP-1)
 George Poole, Army (AP-1)

Tackles
 Don Whitmire, Navy (AP-1)
 George Savitsky, Penn (AP-1)

Guards
 John Green, Army (AP-1)
 Tom Smith, Yale (AP-1)

Centers
 Robert St. Onge, Army (AP-1)

Key
 AP = Associated Press

See also
 1944 College Football All-America Team

References

All-Eastern
All-Eastern college football teams